Democratic Renewal (RD) was a social-liberal political party in Andorra.

History
For the 2005 parliamentary elections, the party was part of an alliance with the Social Democratic Party and Parochial Union of Independents Group named L'Alternativa. The alliance won twelve seats.

The party did not contest the 2009 elections but instead supported Andorra for Change, which won three seats. It did not participate in the 2011 elections. The party was dissolved in September 2011.

References

Political parties in Andorra
Social liberal parties
Defunct liberal political parties
2005 establishments in Andorra
Political parties established in 2005
Political parties disestablished in 2011